Poshtove is an urban-type settlement in the Bakhchysarai Raion of Crimea. Population:

References

External links
 

Bakhchysarai Raion
Urban-type settlements in Crimea